The 2017 Thai League Cup Final was the final match of the 2017 Thai League Cup, the 8th season in the second era of a Thailand's football tournament organised by Football Association of Thailand. It was played at the Supachalasai Stadium in Bangkok, Thailand on 22 November 2017, between SCG Muangthong United a big team from the metropolitan region and Chiangrai United a big team from the Northern part of Thailand.

Road to the final

In their semi-finals, SCG Muangthong United beat BEC Tero Sasana 2–1 . In the same way, Chiangrai United beat Ratchaburi Mitr Phol 1–0 and qualified to the final.

Note: In all results below, the score of the finalist is given first (H: home; A: away; T1: Clubs from Thai League; T2: Clubs from Thai League 2; T3: Clubs from Thai League 3.

Match

Details

Assistant referees:
 Apichit Nopuan
 Rachan Dawangpa
Fourth official:
 Mongkolchai Pechsri
Match Commissioner:
 Aris Kulsawaspakdee
Referee Assessor:
 Praew Seemarksuk

Winner

Prizes for winner
 A champion trophy.
 5,000,000 THB prize money.
 Qualification to 2017 Mekong Club Championship Final.

Prizes for runners-up
 1,000,000 THB prize money.

See also
 2017 Thai League
 2017 Thai League 2
 2017 Thai League 3
 2017 Thai League 4
 2017 Thai FA Cup
 2017 Thai League Cup

References

External links
Thai League cup snapshot from Thai League official website

2017
2